Vulcanops  jennyworthyae is an extinct species of bat that lived during the Miocene in New Zealand, a large burrowing microchiropteran that probably ate arthropods and plant material around twenty million years before present.  It is the type and only described species of the genus Vulcanops.

Taxonomy and etymology
Vulcanops jennyworthyae was described in 2018 from fossilized teeth and bone fragments.
The new genus and species were placed within the family Mystacinidae, commonly called the burrowing bats.
The genus name "Vulcanops" is derived from the Roman god of fire and volcanoes, Vulcan.
The suffix "-ops" is commonly used for bat genera.
"Vulcan" was chosen in homage to the tectonic nature of New Zealand, as well as a historic hotel, Vulcan Hotel, in the mining town of Saint Bathans.
The eponym for the specific epithet "jennyworthyae" is Jennifer P. Worthy "in recognition of her pivotal role in revealing the diversity of the St Bathans Fauna."
Jennifer Worthy is the scientist who discovered the fossils of V. jennyworthyae.
The fossilized remains were found in sediments approximately 16–19 million years old.

Description
Its body mass would be three times the average size of modern bats.
It is the largest bat of its family ever described.

Biology and ecology
The presence of a large hypocone on its upper molars indicates that it was not strictly carnivorous.
A large, blunt hypocone is indicative of herbivory.
It would have lived among the trees while also foraging on the ground.
It likely consumed invertebrates such as insects and spiders.

Their diet likely included a range of animals and plants and resembled the South American species of the Mystacinidae, consuming greater amounts of plant-based foods than the smaller and more carnivorous modern Australasian species.

References

Mystacinidae
Miocene bats
Neogene mammals of Oceania
Fossils of New Zealand
Fossil taxa described in 2018
Prehistoric bat genera
Mammals of New Zealand
Endemic fauna of New Zealand
Endemic mammals of New Zealand